Eithne Duggan is a former camogie player, captain of the All Ireland Camogie Championship winning team in 1998.

Career
She came to prominence with the Bishopstown team that won Cork Senior B honours in 1994 and won All Ireland senior medals in 1995, 1997 1998  and 2002

References

External links
 Camogie.ie Official Camogie Association Website
 Wikipedia List of Camogie players

Cork camogie players
Living people
Year of birth missing (living people)